This article displays the qualifying draw of the 2011 ABN AMRO World Tennis Tournament.

Players

Seeds

Qualifiers

Lucky losers
  Philipp Petzschner

Qualifying draw

First qualifier

Second qualifier

Third qualifier

Fourth qualifier

References
 Qualifying draw

Qualifying
ABN AMRO World Tennis Tournament - qualifying
Qualification for tennis tournaments